Guns and Roses  is a Philippine action drama romance series that aired on ABS-CBN from June 6, 2011, to September 23, 2011, replacing Mara Clara starring Robin Padilla, Bea Alonzo and Diether Ocampo.

This is Robin Padilla's second action primetime series in the network, following the television series Basta't Kasama Kita, which concluded eight years ago. This is the first team up with Bea Alonzo as his leading lady and Diether Ocampo in a TV Production. The TV series concluded with 80 episodes and was replaced by Budoy on its timeslot.

Series overview

Episodes

References

Guns and Roses
2010s television-related lists
Lists of action television series episodes